Ashbourne is a small town in South Australia situated roughly halfway between Meadows and Goolwa, approximately 14 kilometres from the town of Strathalbyn and 43 kilometres from Adelaide.

History
Ashbourne was laid out in 1865 by C. S. Keeling on Bull's Creek in part of his land in the district known as "Finniss Flat".

School 
There is a small school, Eastern Fleurieu School Ashborne Campus. At the moment, 26 students are enrolled here.

Cricket

Despite its small size, Ashbourne has a premier cricket club with several senior and junior grade teams. The Ashbourne Cricket Club, wearing green and gold and known as the Bulls, was established in 1895 and has enjoyed strong links to the Adelaide Oval since that time with founding member and local identity Harry Meyers being closely affiliated with the South Australian Cricket Association (SACA). The soil which formed the Adelaide oval pitches was initially sourced from Ashbourne due to the high suitability of the black clay soils found in the area. The Ashbourne Cricket Club is the longest continuous running club in the Eastern Mount Lofty Ranges and has enjoyed a large degree of success since their formation, particularly from the 1900s to the 1950s where the club dominated the Alexandra Cricket Association.  The superb grounds and turf wicket playing surfaces are regarded as being amongst the best in the Greater Adelaide Hills, Fleurieu Peninsula and Murray Lands Regions.

See also
 Bullock Hill Conservation Park
Cox Scrub Conservation Park

Notes and references

External links
 History of Ashbourne

Towns in South Australia